Souvenirs is the first compilation album released exclusively in Australia to highlight Tina Arena's international career over the previous few years. Divided into three sections covering songs from screen, stage and overseas, Souvenirs includes recordings that had not appeared on any of Arena's Australian albums to date. They include songs from soundtracks, live recordings from a performance at the prestigious Olympia Theatre in Paris, and the singles that launched her as a major star on the continent.

Track listing

Charts and certifications

References

2000 compilation albums
2000 video albums
Tina Arena compilation albums
Albums produced by Peter Asher
Albums produced by Jim Steinman
Albums produced by Walter Afanasieff
Columbia Records compilation albums
Columbia Records video albums
Music video compilation albums